A molecular beam is produced by allowing a gas at higher pressure to expand through a small orifice into a chamber at lower pressure to form a beam of particles (atoms, free radicals, molecules or ions) moving at approximately equal velocities, with very few collisions between the particles. Molecular beams are useful for fabricating thin films in molecular beam epitaxy and artificial structures such as quantum wells, quantum wires, and quantum dots. Molecular beams have also been applied as crossed molecular beams. The molecules in the molecular beam can be manipulated by electrical fields and magnetic fields. Molecules can be decelerated in a Stark decelerator or in a Zeeman slower.

History
The first to study molecular beams were H. Kallmann and F. Reiche who in 1921 were interested in dipole moments and the deflection of beams of polar molecules in an inhomogeneous electric field. Their work inspired indirectly the Stern–Gerlach experiment (1922) that used not molecular beams but atomic beams. The first to report on the relationship between dipole moments and deflection in a molecular beam (using binary salts such as KCl) was Erwin Wrede in 1927.
In 1939 Isidor Rabi invented a molecular beam magnetic resonance method in which two magnets placed one after the other create an inhomogeneous magnetic field. The method was used to measure the magnetic moment of several lithium isotopes with molecular beams of LiCl, LiF and dilithium. This method is a predecessor of NMR. The invention of the maser in 1957 by James P. Gordon, Herbert J. Zeiger and Charles H. Townes was made possible by a molecular beam of ammonia and a special electrostatic quadrupole focuser.

See also 
 Norman Ramsey
 John B. Fenn
 F.M. Devienne
 Dudley R. Herschbach

References

Quantum electronics
Chemical physics